Italian White may refer to:
 a cultivar of Helianthus annuus, the common sunflower
 common fig cultivar